The Amityville haunting is a modern folk story based on the true crimes of Ronald DeFeo Jr. On November 13, 1974, DeFeo shot and killed six members of his family at 112 Ocean Avenue, Amityville, on the south shore of Long Island. He was convicted of second-degree murder in November 1975. In December 1975, George and Kathy Lutz and their three children moved into the house. After 28 days, the Lutzes left the house, claiming to have been terrorized by paranormal phenomena while living there. These events served as the historical basis for Jay Anson's 1977 novel The Amityville Horror, which was followed by a number of sequels and was adapted into a film of the same name in 1979. Since then, many films have been produced that draw explicitly, to a greater or lesser extent, from these historical and literary sources. As Amityville is a real town and the stories of DeFeo and the Lutzes are historical, there can be no proprietary relationship to the underlying story elements associated with the Amityville haunting. As a result of this, there has been no restriction on the exploitation of the story by film producers, which is the reason that most of these films share no continuity, were produced by different companies, and tell widely varying stories.

The Amityville Horror film, released in the summer of 1979, was a major box office success, and went on to become one of the most commercially successful independent films of all time. A series of sequels were released throughout the 1980s and into the 1990s through various distributors; some of the films received theatrical distribution, while others were direct-to-video releases. In 2005, a re-imagining of the first film was released.

Beginning in 2011, there was a resurgence of low-budget direct-to-video independent films based on or loosely inspired by the Amityville events.

In 2017, The Weinstein Company and Dimension Films distributed the first theatrical Amityville film since the 2005 re-imagining. Amityville: The Awakening, which was filmed in 2014, was released theatrically in Ukraine on July 27, 2017, and in the United States on October 28, 2017. In 2018, The Amityville Murders is a direct prequel to the 1979 film and ignores the events of Amityville II: The Possession (1982).

Literature
 The Amityville Horror, a 1977 book by American author Jay Anson
 Murder in Amityville, a 1979 book by Hans Holzer that serves as a prequel to The Amityville Horror
 The Amityville Horror Part II, a 1982 book by John G. Jones that serves as a sequel to The Amityville Horror
 Amityville: The Final Chapter
 Amityville: The Evil Escapes
 The Amityville Curse
 Amityville: The Horror Returns
 Amityville: The Nightmare Continues
 High Hopes: The Amityville Murders
 Amityville: My Sister's Keeper

Films

Overview
The first film to be inspired by the story of the Amityville haunting, The Amityville Horror (1979) chronicles the events of Jay Anson's novel, in which the Lutz family finds their new home in Amityville, New York, to be haunted; the house had been the site of a mass murder by Ronald DeFeo Jr. in 1974. The following film, Amityville II: The Possession, is a prequel based on the book Murder in Amityville by Hans Holzer, and depicts the purported supernatural events in the home that led DeFeo to murder his family. The third installment, Amityville 3-D, is set after the events of the first film, and was released in 3D.

In 1989, the fourth installment, Amityville 4: The Evil Escapes, was released as a made-for-television film, and documents hauntings stemming from a floor lamp that was in the home at the time of the DeFeo murders. The Amityville Curse, released in 1990, follows a group of teenagers who spend the night in a former rectory in Amityville where a priest committed suicide; this installment was set in an entirely different house. Amityville: It's About Time, released in 1992, focuses on a haunted clock that a family from Los Angeles, California takes into their home from an estate sale in New York. The seventh film in the series, Amityville: A New Generation, also utilizes a haunted object as a plot device. This time, a man purchases a mirror possessed by the spirit of his father, who, like DeFeo, also murdered his family in the Amityville house with a shotgun. Amityville Dollhouse (1996) follows a family haunted by spirits unleashed from a doll house replica of the Amityville home.

In 2005, a remake of the 1979 original film was released theatrically. In 2017’s Amityville: The Awakening, which received a limited theatrical release, a family with an ill son moves into the home and find themselves tormented by ghosts who seek to possess the son's body.

Further films would follow, each released direct-to-video or with limited theatrical releases:  The Amityville Haunting (2011; a found footage film that presents supposed home movies that corroborate the family's haunting); The Amityville Asylum (2013, set in a haunted Amityville psychiatric hospital); Amityville Death House (2015, featured yet another explanation for the hauntings); Amityville Playhouse (2016, focuses on a haunted theater in Amityville); Amityville: Vanishing Point (2016, focused on a haunted boarding house in Amityville); The Amityville Legacy (2016, features a haunted toy monkey from the original house), The Amityville Terror (2016, a family moves to Amityville and are tormented both by an evil spirit and the townsfolk who want to keep them trapped there); Amityville: No Escape (2016, college students encounter evil in the forest around Amityville); and Amityville Exorcism (2017, evil spirits possess the daughter of a family that moves to Amityville).

Continuity between films
The first three films released, share some continuity, although they also contain contradictions. Amityville II is a prequel to the original 1979 movie, and tells the story of the murder of the DeFeo family (renamed the Montelli family in the film). Amityville 3-D is a sequel to the first movie, and is based on the accounts of paranormal investigator Stephen Kaplan (renamed John Baxter for the film), who was trying to prove that the Lutz family's story was a hoax. Due to legal disputes with the actual Lutz family, the events of the first movie could not be directly referenced, nor could the Lutz family themselves be referenced by name. Amityville 3-D also refers to the massacre in Amityville II as the "DeFeo murders", despite the renaming of the family to Montelli for that film.

Of the later films, Amityville: The Awakening (2017) is explicitly a different continuity from all of the previous movies, which are depicted as films within the film; the characters watch and discuss the 1979 movie, and one of them brings DVDs of the sequels and remake to the protagonist's house. The Amityville Murders (2018) is a direct prequel to the 1979 film, and ignores the events of Amityville II.

Release

Producers and distributors
The films have at various times been owned by several different production and distribution companies internationally and in the United States. American International Pictures produced and released the original film, before Orion Pictures bought the rights to the film, as well as II and 3-D. Metro-Goldwyn-Mayer (MGM) now owns films one through 3-D, and released them in a DVD box set in 2005. While 4 was a TV film broadcast on NBC, it has been released multiple times by independent distribution companies in recent years (one of which was Vidmark, who also released Curse; Vidmark is now owned by Lionsgate). Multicom Entertainment Group owns distribution rights to Amityville 4: The Evil Escapes, It's About Time, A New Generation and Dollhouse.

Box office

Critical reception

Documentary
 My Amityville Horror, a 2012 documentary focusing on Daniel Lutz's account of the haunting. At the time of the events, he was a child.

See also
 Bloodbath at the House of Death, a 1984 spoof on the 1979 film The Amityville Horror

References

Works cited
 
 

Film series introduced in 1979
American haunted house films
American supernatural horror films
Films based on horror novels
Films about exorcism

Horror films by series
Long Island in fiction
Long Island-related lists